The 2016–17 season was the 14th season in the history of the Scarlets, a Welsh rugby union regional side based in Llanelli, Carmarthenshire. In this season, they won the Pro12 playoffs after finishing third in the league, and also competed in the Rugby Champions Cup and the Anglo-Welsh Cup. It was Wales international centre Jonathan Davies' first season back at the region after leaving for Clermont Auvergne in 2014. Scarlets also signed Welsh international Rhys Patchell, South African international Werner Kruger and New Zealander Johnny McNicholl ahead of the 2016–17 season, whilst Welsh internationals Rhodri Jones and Rhodri Williams, club stalwart Phil John and New Zealand international Regan King were among the players who left.

At the end of the season, Ken Owens, Jonathan Davies and Liam Williams were called up to the British & Irish Lions squad for the 2017 tour to New Zealand. Gareth Davies was later called up to the squad as injury cover, but did not play in any games.

Pre-season and friendlies

Although advertised as a home match, the friendly against Bath was held at Eirias Stadium as opposed to Parc y Scarlets.

Pro12

Fixtures

Play-offs

Table

European Champions Cup

Fixtures

Table

Anglo-Welsh Cup

Fixtures

Table

Statistics
(+ in the Apps column denotes substitute appearance, positions listed are the ones they have started a game in during the season)

Stats accurate as of match played 27 May 2017

Transfers

In

Out

References

2016-17
2016–17 Pro12 by team
2016–17 in Welsh rugby union
2016–17 European Rugby Champions Cup by team